Dankovsky is a rural locality (a khutor) in Bolshedmitrovskoye Rural Settlement, Podgorensky District, Voronezh Oblast, Russia. The population was 156 as of 2010.

Geography 
Dankovsky is located 14 km north of Podgorensky (the district's administrative centre) by road. Krasyukovsky is the nearest rural locality.

References 

Rural localities in Podgorensky District